The 2012-13 edition of the Lebanese FA Cup is the 41st edition to be played. It is the premier knockout tournament for football teams in Lebanon.

The winners qualify for the 2014 AFC Cup.

The qualifying rounds take place in late 2012 with the Premier League clubs joining at the Round of 16 in early 2013.

Round of 16

The round of 16 featured matches between the favorites, last years finalists, Nejmeh against Ansar and Safa against Al Ahed

Quarter finals

Semi finals

Final

External links
http://www.futbol24.com/national/Lebanon/Lebanese-Cup/2012-2013/ name=Futbol24.com 
soccerway.com

Lebanese FA Cup seasons
Cup
Leb